"Up to eleven", also phrased as "these go to eleven", is an idiom from popular culture, coined in the 1984 film This Is Spinal Tap, where  guitarist Nigel Tufnel demonstrates an amplifier whose volume knobs are marked from zero to eleven, instead of the usual zero to ten. The primary implication of the reference is one in which things that are essentially the same are seen as different, due to mislabeling or the user's misunderstanding of the underlying operating principles. A secondary reference may be anything being exploited to its utmost limits, or apparently exceeding them. 

In 2002, the phrase entered the Shorter Oxford English Dictionary with the definition "up to maximum volume".

Original scene from This Is Spinal Tap
The phrase was coined in a scene from the 1984 mockumentary/rockumentary This Is Spinal Tap by the character Nigel Tufnel, played by Christopher Guest. In this scene, Nigel gives the rockumentary's director, Marty DiBergi, played by Rob Reiner, a tour of his stage equipment. While Nigel is showing Marty his Marshall guitar amplifiers, he points out a selection whose control knobs all have a highest setting of eleven, unlike standard amplifiers whose volume settings are typically numbered from 0 to 10. Believing that this numbering increases the highest volume of the amp, he explains, "It's one louder, isn't it?" When Marty asks why not simply make the 10 setting louder, Nigel hesitates before responding, "These go to eleven."

Other instances

Prior examples 

The use of "11" as a maximum pre-dates This Is Spinal Tap by almost forty years. In 1947, the Baldwin Locomotive Works and the Chesapeake and Ohio Railway introduced the Chesapeake and Ohio class M-1 steam turbine locomotive. The locomotive's throttle included eleven settings, ranging from one (idling) to eleven (full speed).

Gibson Les Paul guitars with low-impedance pickups were outfitted with special controls designed by Les Paul himself. Controls included a "Decade Switch" that went up to 11.

Cultural examples
As a consequence of the film, real bands and musicians started buying equipment whose knobs went up to 11, or even higher, with Eddie Van Halen reputedly being the first to do so. Marshall, the company that provided amplifiers for the film that the custom-marked knobs were applied to, now sells amplifiers such as its JCM900 (first sold in 1990) whose knobs are marked from 0 to 20. The QSC 3500 and 3800 amplifiers made for the professional sound company Sound Image in the 1990s went to 11, as do amps from Soldano and Friedman.

Other controls with a maximum of 11 include SSL mixing consoles, Amazon Alexa, the BBC's iPlayer on demand video player, the headphone volume control on the PreSonus AudioBox 1818VSL, the volume control on the Apogee Mini-DAC, the IRIX audio panel (when invoked with the undocumented -spinaltap option), and the Tesla Model S's volume control. The tachometer on a Singer Vehicle Design modified Porsche 911 goes up to 11, representing 11,000 RPM. The ″Drive″ knob of the Elektron Syntakt drum computer and synthesizer goes from 0 to 11 with 1 in the middle, using 0—1 for normal clean audio levels followed by 10 additional steps of distorted range.

On its primary page for This Is Spinal Tap, the IMDb displays the user rating for the film out of 11 stars (e.g. 7.9/11) instead of the standard scale of one to ten. However, only 10 rating stars are actually shown on the page, and user ratings can only be submitted up to 10 stars. Other IMDb pages display the rating out of 10.

The influence of the phrase "up to eleven" is such that it has been used outside of music; in 2016, for example, astronomer Krzysztof Stanek described the brightest-known object in the universe as being "as if nature took everything we know about magnetars and turned it up to 11."

In Android 11, the ubiquitous version information animation also depicts a retro dial, with 10 divisions represented as dots. As the user turns it beyond the 10 divisions, the 11th division is displayed as a number.

See also
Loudest band in the world (list)

, "a limit past which safety can no longer be guaranteed"
Plaid Speed In the movie Spaceballs, the consequence of exceeding the Red line of Ludicrous Speed.
. (Similar expressions include "110%")

References

English-language idioms
Quotations from film
Comedy catchphrases
Spinal Tap (band)
1984 neologisms